Ras Al Khor Wildlife Sanctuary is a wetland reserve in Dubai, renowned for attracting large numbers of migratory birds. It is also home to a large population of crustaceans, small mammals, and fish.

Overview
Ras Al Khor Wildlife Sanctuary represents an enclave of relative wilderness amidst traffic and sprawling urban infrastructure. Located just as the name in Arabic suggests, at the Cape of the Creek, it is among the few urban protected areas of the world.

The Dubai Municipality has taken great efforts to protect and preserve the biodiversity of this delicate ecosystem. The wetland has been fenced off from the public and three birding hides have been built. The bird hides are a first step towards the development of more elaborate visitor education facilities in the protected area. The WWF UAE Project Office collaborated with Dubai Municipality's Environment Department, in setting up the facilities that were sponsored by the National Bank of Dubai.

Opportunities for experiencing a natural environment in this rapidly building-up emirate are so limited that the opening of Ras Al Khor to visitors is a boon to present and potential nature lovers.

There are three birding hides located on the perimeter of the sanctuary open to the public. Entrance is free and operates from 7:30am-5:30pm in the Winter and 6:00 am to 6:00 pm in the Summer.

Ras Al Khor is also home to about 470 species of fauna and 47 kinds of flora. Greater flamingoes (Phoenicopterus roseus), are one of the main attractions for the preserve.

Species

Some of the regular visitors to the sanctuary are:

 Asian pied myna
 Black-winged stilt
 Blue-cheeked bee-eater
 Caspian tern
 Citrine wagtail
 Common greenshank
 Common hoopoe
 Common kingfisher
 Common sandpiper
 Common snipe
 Cormorant
 Curlew
 Dunlin
 Eurasian marsh harrier
 Great black backed gull
 Great egret
 Greater flamingo
 Grey francolin
 Grey heron
 Grey plover
 Indian peafowl
 Indian roller
 Indian silverbill
 Isabelline shrike
 Little bittern
 Little green bee-eater
 Malabar lark
 Mallard
 Osprey
 Pied avocet
 Purple sunbird
 Red-vented bulbul
 Red-wattled lapwing
 Ringed plover
 Ruddy turnstone
 Sanderling
 Snowy plover
 Spotted eagle
 Terek sandpiper
 Western heron
 White wagtail
 White-eared bulbul
 Yellow billed stork

Gallery

See also
 Al Marmoom Desert Conservation Reserve, Dubai
 Al-Wathba Wetland Reserve, Abu Dhabi
 Dubai Desert Conservation Reserve
 Jebel Hafeet National Park, Abu Dhabi
 Mangrove National Park, Abu Dhabi
 Sir Abu Nu'ayr, Sharjah
 Sir Bani Yas, Abu Dhabi
 Wadi Wurayah, Fujairah
 Wildlife of the United Arab Emirates

References

External links
 Official website
 Government information

Year of establishment missing
Communities in Dubai
Ramsar sites in the United Arab Emirates
Wildlife sanctuaries of the United Arab Emirates